Panaeolus antillarum is a species of mushroom in the family Bolbitiaceae. It is edible but not commonly eaten. It is found from northern North America through Mexico into northern South America.

It is often mistaken for Panaeolus semiovatus var. phalaenarum or Panaeolus cyanescens, the latter species can be distinguished by the thinner, grayer cap and blue bruising.

Description 
Cap: 3 to 6 cm, bell-shaped to convex, white to light gray or yellowish. The caps are thick, smooth, often with fine wrinkles and acquire a silver white shiny color in age.
Gills: Gray in young specimens, turning black as the spores mature.
Spore print: Jet black.
Stipe: 4 to 22 cm long and .5 to 2 cm thick, solid, sometimes slightly larger at the base.
Taste: Fungal.
Odor: Fungal.
Size: Small to medium.
Microscopic features: Spores ellipsoid, 15 - 20 (21) x 10 - 14 x 8 - 10(11) μm. Cheilocystidia cylindrical to narrowly utriform, colorless, 30 - 45 μm. Sulphidia clavate, sometimes with a stalk, 25 - 50 μm. Basidia four spored, 30 - 35 micrometers long.

Distribution and habitat
It's common and widely distributed. It grows on dung.

See also 

List of Panaeolus species

References

External links
 Mushroom Observer - Panaeolus antillarum
 Mushroom Observer - Panaeolus antillarum
 Mushroom John - Panaeolus antillarum

antillarum